La Vengeance d'une blonde is a 1994 French comedy film directed by Jeannot Szwarc.

Plot
Gérard Breha is journalist on a Breton regional channel. He host, happy, his last Show, as he has been named host to the 23 hours newsreader on the large private TV channel 8... He moved with his wife Corine, actress, and their two children in Paris, tentatively in Jany (great seductress), the mother of Corine, to start this new life.

Cast
 Christian Clavier as Gérard Bréha
 Marie-Anne Chazel as Corine Bréha
 Annie Cordy as Jany
 Clémentine Célarié as Marie-Ange de la Baume
 Thierry Lhermitte as Gilles Favier
 Marc de Jonge as Vernon
 Philippe Khorsand as Régis Montdor
 Angelo Infanti as Giacomo Contini
 Antoine Duléry as Alex
 Franck de la Personne as Stéphane
 Jean-Paul Muel as Castol
 Maurice Lamy as The Albino
 Mathias Jung as The Hail
 François Toumarkine as Ventru
 Laurent Gendron as Goulot
 Véronique Moest as Bella
 Naël Kervoas as Athéna
 Michel Vivier as Raymond
 Michel Fortin as Norbert
 Urbain Cancelier as The delivery guy
 Fabienne Chaudat as The servant

Reception
The film opened at number one at the French box office.

Music

Eric Lévi had composed the soundtrack for Les Visiteurs, the highest-grossing film in France in 1993, also starring Christian Clavier.  For La Vengeance d'une Blonde he wrote the score and the end-credit song. The song People and Places was written by Lévi with Roxanne Seeman and Philip Bailey, who sings it as a duet with Dee Dee Bridgewater. Philippe Manca is featured on guitar.  Thierry Rogan mixed the track at Studio Mega.

Track listing

References

External links

 

1994 films
1994 comedy films
Films directed by Jeannot Szwarc
French comedy films
1990s French films